Radim Kučera (born 1 March 1974) is a Czech football coach and former player who played most of his career for Sigma Olomouc.

Playing career
Kučera began his playing career in the Czech league, playing for FK Dukla Hranice, VP Frýdek-Místek and Kaučuk Opava. He moved to Gambrinus liga side Sigma Olomouc, where he would become captain. He appeared in 280 Czech league matches before moving to Bundesliga side Arminia Bielefeld in August 2005.

When Kučera joined Arminia, fellow Czechs Petr Gabriel and David Kobylík were in the squad, which helped him adjust to Bundesliga football. His five year spell with Arminia was marked with several relegation battles, culminating in relegation after the 2008–09 season.

Despite being one of the most successful Czech football players during his time with Sigma Olomouc and also in Germany with Arminia, Kučera has never played for the Czech Republic national team.

Honours 
Sigma Olomouc
 Czech Cup: 2011–12

References

External links 
 

1974 births
Living people
People from Valašské Meziříčí
Sportspeople from the Zlín Region
Czech footballers
Association football defenders
Czech First League players
Bundesliga players
2. Bundesliga players
SK Sigma Olomouc players
SFC Opava players
Arminia Bielefeld players
Czech football managers
FC Baník Ostrava managers
FK Teplice managers
FC Vysočina Jihlava managers
1. SC Znojmo managers
Czech expatriate footballers
Czech expatriate sportspeople in Germany
Expatriate footballers in Germany